John George Geier, III (Flint, Michigan; January 24, 1934 – September 26, 2009) was an American psychologist who worked extensively on the DISC assessment systems, which improve work/life performance. Dr. Geier had a 40-year career in the assessment process and was known as a pioneer and founder of personnel selection, training and research, and a leader of human assessment. During his career, he developed numerous assessment tools, including the DiSC Personal Profile System, and the Personality Factor Profile, used for more than 50 million people around the world and translated to more than 30 different languages.

Family background and early years 
John G. Geier III was born to John George Geier, Jr. (1900–1967) and Irene E. Bock (1911–1978). John III's father was of Volga-German extraction, and Irene was the daughter of Jewish immigrants from the Austro-Hungarian Empire.

John III was a bright student who worked his way through college by assisting his father on painting jobs.

Education and career 
John G. Geier graduated from NWC with a major in speech (psychology minor). He excelled in speech and debate and served as senior class vice president. He chose Joshua 1:8 as his verse for the '58 yearbook: "Do not let this Book of the Law depart from your mouth; meditate on it day and night so that you may be careful to do everything written in it. Then you will be prosperous and successful."

He earned a master in speech communication (educational psychology & statistics minor) and a Ph.D. in communication theory (organizational behavior/public administration minor) at the U of M While attending the university, he worked at NWC as an instructor, then as assistant to the president and director of public relations.

Dr. Geier's career included co-founder of the health ecology divisions, director of behavioral sciences and management education, and dean of the summer school at the University of Minnesota, dean of the extended university, University of Arizona, adjunct professor at the University of Michigan Graduate School of Business where he taught the internationally renowned Manager of Managers seminar, and work as a researcher, author and consultant.

His honors included Outstanding Teacher of the Year (health sciences), U of M; Distinguished Service Award, Citicorp Executive Development Center; and Special Appreciation Award, National Telemarketing Association. He conducted research for the U.S. Health Commission, U of M Medical School, Oldsmobile and IBM Corp.

Dr Geier's professional and community participation included founder/president of Outreach Home for the Mentally Retarded (now the Portland Residence), designer and instructor for sensitivity training courses for Minneapolis and Saint Paul police departments, and lead instructor for the Allie Q. Brown Afro-American Special School.

References

20th-century American psychologists
University of Minnesota faculty
University of Wisconsin–Madison faculty
University of Arizona faculty
University of Michigan faculty
American people of German-Russian descent
American people of Austrian-Jewish descent
American people of Hungarian-Jewish descent
2009 deaths
1934 births